John Maule may refer to:

Sir John Maule (barrister) (1818–1889), first Director of Public Prosecutions for England and Wales
John Maule (MP) (1706–1781), Scottish Member of Parliament in the British House of Commons